Edward Piercy (26 December 1882 – 3 January 1968) was a British cyclist. He competed in the tandem event at the 1908 Summer Olympics.

References

External links
 

1882 births
1968 deaths
English male cyclists
Olympic cyclists of Great Britain
Cyclists at the 1908 Summer Olympics
People from Southwark
Cyclists from Greater London